The 1966 North Texas State Mean Green football team was an American football team that represented North Texas State University (now known as the University of North Texas) during the 1966 NCAA University Division football season as a member of the Missouri Valley Conference. In their 21st year under head coach Odus Mitchell, the team compiled an 8–2 record and finished as Missouri Valley Conference co-champion.

Schedule

References

North Texas State
North Texas Mean Green football seasons
Missouri Valley Conference football champion seasons
North Texas State Mean Green football